Devil's Train is the second album released by Eric Sardinas.

Track listing
 "Piece of Me" (Sardinas) – 3:04
 "My Sweet Time" (Sardinas) – 4:13
 "Texola" (Sardinas) – 3:35
 "Aggravatin' Papa (Sardinas) – 3:54
 "Killin' Time Blues (Sardinas) – 4:24
 "My Kind of Woman (James, Sehorn) – 4:36
 "Country Mile" (Sardinas) – 4:06
 "Gambling Man Blues" (Edwards) – 5:04
 "Down to Whiskey" (Sardinas) – 3:01
 "Devil's Train" (Sardinas) – 2:59
 "Be Your Man" (Sardinas) – 3:26
 "Sidewinder" (Sardinas) – 5:48
 "8 Goin' South" (Sardinas) – 4:01

References

2001 albums
Eric Sardinas albums